Harold Albert Manson (17 May 1894 – 23 April 1963) was an Australian rules footballer who played with St Kilda and Geelong in the Victorian Football League (VFL).

Notes

External links 

1894 births
1963 deaths
Australian rules footballers from Victoria (Australia)
St Kilda Football Club players
Geelong Football Club players
Warrnambool Football Club players
North Geelong Football Club players
People from Warrnambool